In mathematics, the Dawson function or Dawson integral
(named after H. G. Dawson) 
is the one-sided Fourier–Laplace sine transform of the Gaussian function.

Definition

The Dawson function is defined as either:

The Dawson function is the one-sided Fourier–Laplace sine transform of the Gaussian function,

It is closely related to the error function erf, as

where erfi is the imaginary error function,  Similarly,

in terms of the real error function, erf.

In terms of either erfi or the Faddeeva function  the Dawson function can be extended to the entire complex plane:

which simplifies to

for real 

For  near zero,   For  large,  More specifically, near the origin it has the series expansion

while for large  it has the asymptotic expansion

More precisely 

where  is the double factorial. 

 satisfies the differential equation

with the initial condition  Consequently, it has extrema for

resulting in x = ±0.92413887..., F(x) = ±0.54104422....

Inflection points follow for

resulting in x = ±1.50197526..., F(x) = ±0.42768661.... (Apart from the trivial inflection point at  )

Relation to Hilbert transform of Gaussian

The Hilbert transform of the Gaussian is defined as

P.V. denotes the Cauchy principal value, and we restrict ourselves to real   can be related to the Dawson function as follows. Inside a principal value integral, we can treat  as a generalized function or distribution, and use the Fourier representation

We change variables to 

The integral can be performed as a contour integral around a rectangle in the complex plane. Taking the imaginary part of the result gives

where  is the Dawson function as defined above.

We see this with the technique of differentiating inside the integral sign. Let

Introduce

The th derivative is

We thus find

For example,  Alternatively,  can be calculated using the recurrence relation (for )

See also

References

External links

 gsl_sf_dawson in the GNU Scientific Library
 libcerf, numeric C library for complex error functions, provides a function voigt(x, sigma, gamma) with approximately 13–14 digits precision. It is based on the Faddeeva function as implemented in the MIT Faddeeva Package
 Dawson's Integral (at Mathworld)
 Error functions

Gaussian function
Special functions